Wilson Alberto Carpintero Mendoza (born 15 September 1977 in Tubara) is a retired Colombian football striker.

External links
 

1977 births
Living people
Colombian footballers
Colombia international footballers
Colombian expatriate footballers
Association football forwards
Categoría Primera A players
Categoría Primera B players
Independiente Medellín footballers
Independiente Santa Fe footballers
Deportivo Pasto footballers
Atlético Bucaramanga footballers
Atlético Junior footballers
Caracas FC players
Millonarios F.C. players
La Equidad footballers
Cúcuta Deportivo footballers
Envigado F.C. players
Patriotas Boyacá footballers
Deportes Quindío footballers
Tigres F.C. footballers
Colombian expatriate sportspeople in Venezuela
Expatriate footballers in Venezuela
People from Atlántico Department